Pay for performance may refer to:

Pay for performance (human resources), a system of employee payment in the United States that links compensation to measures of work quality or goals
Pay for performance (healthcare), an emerging movement in health insurance in Britain and the United States, in which providers are rewarded for quality of healthcare system
Pay-for-Performance (Federal Government), proposed and implemented systems of incentive pay based on job performance metrics.  See also "Federal Government Merit Pay" section in merit pay
Pay for play, money is exchanged for services

See also
 Compensation of employees
 Incentive program
 Merit pay
 Performance-related pay